Robert Adams (1540–1595) was a 16th-century English architect, engraver and surveyor of buildings to Queen Elizabeth. He was a son of Clement Adams.

None of Robert Adams's architectural works are known to have survived, but some of his plans and engravings are still extant, such as a large 1588 plan of Middleburgh and, from the same year, a small parchment roll, drawn with pen, entitled "Thamesis Descriptio", which shows lines drawn across the River Thames and the various ranges of guns at different points from Tilbury Fort to London. Adams also drew and engraved representations of the Spanish Armada's activities on the British coasts, which were published by Augustine Ryther in 1589.

Robert Adams died in his 55th year and was buried in the church at Greenwich, where the following inscription was placed to his memory:

"Egregio viro Roberto Adams, operum regiorum supervisori, architecturae peritissimo. Ob. 1595. Simon Basil, operationum regiarum contrarotulator, hoc posuit monumentum 1601."

To the distinguished Robert Adams, supervisor of the royal works, most skilled at architecture. Died 1595. Simon Basil, his successor at the royal works, put up this monument here 1601.

References
Long, George (1842–44). The Biographical Dictionary of the Society for the Diffusion of Useful Knowledge, 4 volumes. London: Longman, Brown, Green & Longmans.

Notes

1540 births
1595 deaths
16th-century English architects
English surveyors
English engravers
Place of birth unknown
Date of death unknown
Place of death unknown
Date of birth unknown
16th-century engravers